Giacomo Poggi (born 30 July 1960) is an Italian male retired racewalker, who participated at the 1987 World Championships in Athletics.

Achievements

See also
 Italian team at the running events
 Italy at the IAAF World Race Walking Cup

References

External links
 

1960 births
Living people
Italian male racewalkers
World Athletics Championships athletes for Italy
Universiade medalists in athletics (track and field)
Universiade silver medalists for Italy
Medalists at the 1987 Summer Universiade
20th-century Italian people